Padua “Gino Allegri” Airport  is an airport serving Padua, Veneto, Italy.

The airport is named after Gino Allegri, an Italian aviator who lost his life while attempting to land in a small airfield in the Province of Padua during World War I.

See also

List of airports in Italy

References

External links

Airports in Italy